Plantagenet is a three-series sequence of BBC Radio 4 radio plays by the British dramatist Mike Walker, broadcast in the Classic Serial strand, based on the account of the Plantagenet dynasty in Holinshed's Chronicles. Each series consisted of three weekly episodes, the first premiering from 14 February 2010, the second from 29 May 2011 and the third from 1 April 2012.

Episode list

Series 1

Henry II – What is A Man?
King Henry II – David Warner
Queen Eleanor – Jane Lapotaire
Prince Richard – Joseph Cohen-Cole
Prince Hal – Piers Wehner
Prince Geoffrey – Rhys Jennings
William Marshall – Stephen Hogan
Bertran de Bourne – Bruce Alexander
King Louis – Philip Fox
Courtier – John Biggins

Richard I – Lionheart
Queen Eleanor – Jane Lapotaire
Richard – Ed Stoppard
King Henry II – David Warner
William Marshall – Stephen Hogan
King Philip – John Biggins
Saladin – Raad Rawi
El-adel – Khalid Laith
Baldwin – Ewan Hooper
Prince John, later King John – Neil Stuke
Hugh – Philip Fox
Robert of Champagne – Rhys Jennings
Conrad – Piers Wehner

John, by the Grace of God
Queen Eleanor – Jane Lapotaire
King Richard – Ed Stoppard
King John – Neil Stuke
William Marshall – Stephen Hogan
Prince Arthur – Ryan Watson
Queen Isabelle – Emerald O'Hanrahan
King Philip – John Biggins
Saladin – Raad Rawi
El-Adel – Khalid Laith
Doctor/Langton – Ewan Hooper
Girard – Joseph Cohen-Cole
De Roche – Bruce Alexander
Fitzwalter – Piers Wehner
Will Marshall – Rhys Jennings
Prince Henry, later Henry III – Bertie Gilbert

Series 2

Edward I – Old Soldiers
King Edward I – Philip Jackson
Margaret, Edward's second wife – Ellie Kendrick
Ned, later King Edward II – Sam Troughton
Piers Gaveston – Simon Bubb
William Wallace – James Lailey
Roger Bigod – Jonathan Forbes

Edward II – The Greatest Traitor
King Edward II – Sam Troughton
Isabella, Edward's wife and Mortimer's lover – Hattie Morahan
Roger Mortimer – Trystan Gravelle
Prince Edward, later King Edward III – Joseph Samrai
Hugh Despenser – Jonathan Forbes

Richard II – And All Our Dreams Will End in Death
King Richard II, Edward III's grandson and heir – Patrick Kennedy
Henry Bolingbroke – Blake Ritson
Queen Ann – Alex Tregear
Gloucester – Peter Polycarpou
John of Gaunt – Sean Baker

Series 3

Henry V – True Believers
Hal, later King Henry V ...Luke Treadaway
Katherine of France, Henry V's wife...Lydia Leonard
Thomas of Earlham...James Lailey
Sir John Oldcastle...Nicky Henson
King Henry IV...Paul Moriarty
Badby...Simon Bubb
Bradmore...Carl Prekopp

Henry VI – A Simple Man
King Henry VI...Al Weaver
Margaret...Aimee-Ffion Edwards
Richard, Duke of York... Shaun Dooley
Cardinal Beaufort...Paul Moriarty
Earl of Warwick...Gerard McDermott
Duke of Somerset...Carl Prekopp
Edward of York...Simon Bubb

Richard III – The Three Brothers
Queen Elizabeth, wife of Edward IV...Nancy Carroll
King Edward IV...Simon Bubb
King Richard III...Carl Prekopp
Clarence...Christopher Webster
Margaret, widow of Henry VI...Aimee Ffion Edwards
Warwick...Gerard McDermott
Stafford...Adam Billington
Lewis...James Lailey
Bishop...Paul Moriarty

External links
BBC site – Series 1
BBC site – Series 2

2010 audio plays
2011 audio plays
British radio dramas
2010 radio dramas
2011 radio dramas
Cultural depictions of Eleanor of Aquitaine
Cultural depictions of Richard I of England
Cultural depictions of Saladin
Cultural depictions of Henry VIII
Cultural depictions of William Wallace
Cultural depictions of John, King of England
House of Plantagenet
Cultural depictions of Edward I of England